Movaya was a Seattle-based technology company that developed mobile game distribution and management solutions. It was formed in 2004 by John Calian, Phil Yerkes and Stanley Wang. Movaya also operated a wholly owned subsidiary in Chengdu, China.

Movaya's client and distribution relationships included: Capcom, Walmart, Gamehouse, RealArcade, RealNetworks, Reaxion, Superscape, COM2US, GOSUB 60, Kingston Technology and Mobliss.

History

Movaya launched PlugNPlay - a mobile game ecommerce network - in March 2007

Movaya launched TryNBuy - a mobile game free trial download service - in February 2008

Movaya was purchased by Digby Mobile Commerce in late 2009. Digby was itself acquired by Phunware in May 2014.

Mobile Game Title Examples in Movaya Network

1942 (video game)
Bejeweled
Cake Mania
Mega Man (video game)
Solitaire
Street Fighter (video game)
Tetris
Tom Clancy's Splinter Cell
Tony Hawk's Underground
Yetisports

References

Video game companies of the United States
Video game development companies
Video game companies established in 2004
Companies based in Seattle